Paulinella is a genus of at least eleven
species including both freshwater and marine amoeboids.

Its most famous members are the three photosynthetic species P. chromatophora, P. micropora and P. longichromatophora, the first two being freshwater forms and the third a marine form, which have recently (in evolutionary terms) taken on a cyanobacterium as an endosymbiont. As a result they are no longer able to perform phagocytosis like their non-photosynthetic relatives. The event to permanent endosymbiosis probably occurred with a cyanobiont. The resulting organelle is a photosynthetic plastid that is often referred to as a 'cyanelle' or chromatophore, and is the only other known primary endosymbiosis event of photosynthetic cyanobacteria, although primary endosymbiosis with a non-photosynthetic cyanobacterial symbiont have occurred in the diatom family Rhopalodiaceae. 
The endosymbiotic event happened about 90–140 million years ago in a cyanobacterial species which diverged about 500 million years ago from the ancestors of its sister clade that consist of the living members of the Prochlorococcus and Synechococcus cyanobacteria genera, which is a different clade to the plastids belonging to the Archaeplastida.

This is striking because the chloroplasts of all other known photosynthetic eukaryotes derive ultimately from a single cyanobacterium endosymbiont, which was taken in about 1.6 billion years ago by an ancestral archaeplastidan (and subsequently adopted into other eukaryote groups through secondary endosymbiosis events, and later tertiary and quaternary endosymbiosis, etc). The only exception is the ciliate Pseudoblepharisma tenue, which in addition to a photosynthetic symbiont that is a captured green algae, also has a photosynthetic prokaryote as a symbiont; a purple bacteria with a reduced genome, instead of a cyanobacteria.

The chromatophore genome has gone through a reduction, and is now just one third the size of the genome of its closest free living relatives, but still 10-fold larger than most plastid genomes. Some of the genes have been lost, others have migrated to the amoeba's nucleus through endosymbiotic gene transfer. Other genes have degenerated due to Muller's ratchet - accumulations of harmful mutations due to genetic isolation, and have probably been replaced with genes from other microbes through horizontal gene transfer. Some of the genes the nucleus received from the chromatophore were multiplied many times over through a “copy-paste” mechanism called retrotransposition, enabling them to function more efficiently and making them more tolerant against toxic compounds associated with photosynthesis. This changed the metabolism of the amoeba so much that it could no longer feed on microbes like its ancestors, and it became completely dependent on its endosymbiont, which in turn has lost so many genes it can no longer survive outside its host cell.

The nuclear genes of P. chromatophora (those regions not modified by the symbiont) are most closely related to the heterotrophic P. ovalis. P. ovalis also have at least two cyanobacterial-like genes, which were probably integrated into their genome through horizontal gene transfer from its cyanobacterial prey. Similar genes could have made the photosynthetic species pre-equipped to accept the chromatophore.

References 

Cercozoa genera
Imbricatea